Disney University (DU) is the global training program for employees of the parks and experiences divisions at The Walt Disney Company also known as Cast Members. Many college students can participate through the Disney college program. The Disney college program is a full-time paid internship at Walt Disney World in Orlando, Florida. Students can receive academic credit while building their resume.

Although Disney University is not an accredited institution, courses are primarily designed, developed, and delivered by experienced professionals. However, in order to enroll, one needs to be enrolled in an accredited college that will allow the student to take classes and work at Disney. Most colleges allowing it have internships available, and give college credit to do the internship while taking Disney classes. Disney University has traditionally provided learning instructor-led classroom sessions, but eventually expanded delivery methods to accommodate Disney's diverse and growing audience with the advent of eLearning and virtual classrooms.

Disney University is also the name of the training locations where Disney Cast Members attend classroom sessions. Buildings are located at Walt Disney World near Orlando, Florida, Disneyland's Team Disney Anaheim, near Disneyland, and Burbank's Team Disney Headquarters. The Walt Disney World building is located behind the Magic Kingdom, across from the Cast Member parking lot. It is also where newly hired Cast Members, Disney College Program student interns, and Disney International Programs participants attend employee orientation, known as "Disney Traditions". Disney University does not have its own specific building at Disneyland, but the training classes are held inside of conference rooms Team Disney Anaheim.

All new Cast Members are required to attend 'Traditions' on their first day of work; this class imparts the importance of Disney culture, heritage, values, and policies through media and group activities. This is the day where new Cast Members get their first sight of backstage.

The two-story building at Walt Disney World houses several learning and conference spaces, computer classrooms, professional offices, building operation support (Production Services), the Disney University Library (formerly Disney Learning Center), Partners Federal Credit Union branch and ATM, a SodexoMAGIC cafeteria, and a Company D employee store, where employees can purchase discounted park tickets for family and friends.

References

Walt Disney World
The Walt Disney Company